Berit Lisa Matilda Ericson (born 9 May 1988), known as Lisa Ericson (married name Örn), is a Swedish sports sailor. She competed in the Women's 470 class at the 2012 Summer Olympics and the 49erFX event at the 2016 Summer Olympics.

References

External links
 
 
 
 
 

1988 births
Living people
Swedish female sailors (sport)
Olympic sailors of Sweden
Sailors at the 2012 Summer Olympics – 470
Sailors at the 2016 Summer Olympics – 49er FX
49er FX class sailors